FV Biebrich is a German association football club from the town of Biebrich part of Wiesbaden, Hesse.

History
The club was founded on 10 November 1902 as Biebricher Fußballclub and took on the name Biebricher Fußballverein 1902 on 7 April 1913.

In 1957, the club became part of the Amateurliga Hessen (II) which became a third tier circuit after the introduction of the country's new Bundesliga (I) and two Regionalliga (II). FV disappeared into lower level local play after being demoted in 1968. Their best result during their time in the Amateurliga was a fourth-place finish.

Nowadays the club plays in the tier six Verbandsliga Hessen-Mitte.

References

External links
Official team site

Football clubs in Germany
Association football clubs established in 1902
Football clubs in Hesse
1902 establishments in Germany